Munderf is an unincorporated community in Jefferson County, in the U.S. state of Pennsylvania.

History
A post office was established at Munderf in 1885, and remained in operation until 1933. It was the last post office in Polk Township.

References

Unincorporated communities in Jefferson County, Pennsylvania
Unincorporated communities in Pennsylvania